Rev. Canon Alfred Swann, MA, DSC (12 July 1893 –  7 October 1961) was Dean and Archdeacon of Hong Kong from 1927 to 1935.

He was born in Japan to British parents. He was educated at Rugby and Trinity Hall, Cambridge. After wartime service in the RNVR he was ordained in  1922. Following a curacy in Kirkburton he was Vicar of Liversedge before his time in Hong Kong; and  held incumbencies in Wiltshire and Somerset afterwards.

References

1893 births
1955 deaths
People educated at Rugby School
Royal Naval Volunteer Reserve personnel of World War I
Recipients of the Distinguished Service Cross (United Kingdom)
Alumni of Trinity Hall, Cambridge
Deans of Hong Kong
Archdeacons of Hong Kong